The City of Yarra is a local government area (LGA) in Victoria, Australia in the inner eastern and northern suburbs of Melbourne. The City of Yarra was formed in 1994 as a result of the amalgamation of the former Cities of Richmond, Collingwood, Fitzroy, and parts of Carlton North (previously part of the City of Melbourne) and parts of Alphington and Fairfield (previously part of the former City of Northcote).

The administrative centre of the City of Yarra is the old Richmond Town Hall in Bridge Road, Richmond. The Collingwood Town Hall in Hoddle Street, Abbotsford is also still used by the council as secondary offices and as a service centre, and the Fitzroy Town Hall in Napier Street, Fitzroy is used for the local library and for use as a community space. Some council committees also meet at the Fitzroy and Collingwood Town Halls.

The city is culturally and socially diverse. The 2016 Australian Census found that 38.8% of residents were born outside Australia, with the largest numbers being born in England, New Zealand, Vietnam, China and Greece.

The suburbs of the City of Yarra were established in the mid-to-late 19th century and retain a Victorian appearance. The majority of housing in the city is made up of Victorian cottages or terraces or apartments built from the 1960s.

The City of Yarra has some of Melbourne's best shopping streets. These include Bridge Road and Swan and Victoria Streets in Richmond, Brunswick and Gertrude streets in Fitzroy and Smith Street in Collingwood. In 2021, Smith Street was named the coolest street in the world.

As of November 2022, the mayor is independent councillor Claudia Nguyen, and the deputy mayor is Greens councillor Edward Crossland. The CEO since June 2022 is Sue Wilkinson.

Australia Day
In August 2017, the City of Yarra Council voted unanimously at a town hall meeting to cancel annual Australia Day events, including citizenship ceremonies and instead hold a culturally sensitive event "marking the loss of Indigenous culture". The council also voted to begin lobbying the federal government to change the date of Australia's national day and to use council publications and media to campaign in favour of changing the date. Then Prime Minister, Malcolm Turnbull, accused the council of "using a day that should unite Australians to divide Australians". The City of Darebin later followed suit.

Council 
Yarra City Council is composed of nine councillors elected proportionally as three separate wards, each electing three councillors. All councillors are elected for a fixed four-year term of office. The Mayor is elected annually in November by a special meeting of the full council. The most recent local government election was held in October 2020.

The current Council, elected in 2020, in order of election by ward, is:

Past Yarra councillors

5 Wards (1996–2004)

3 Wards (2004–present)

Election results

2020 election results

Townships and localities
In the 2021 census, the city had a population of 90,114 up from 86,657 in the 2016 census.

^ - Territory divided with another LGA

Economy

The City of Yarra has a high concentration of fashion, technology, and media businesses. Companies located in the City of Yarra include:
 Aesop has its global headquarters on Smith Street, Fitzroy.
 Carsales.com has its head office located on Punt Road, Richmond.
 Computershare, one of the largest stock exchange technology and registrar service businesses in the world is located on Johnston Street Abbotsford.
 Country Road, an upscale Australia clothing and homewares manufacturer and retailer is headquartered on Church Street, Richmond
 Epworth the not-for-profit private health care group, employ 1,800 staff at their head office, and largest hospital, on Bridge Road.
 GlaxoSmithKline operates offices of its pharmaceutical division on Johnston Street, Abbotsford.
 Just Group and its brands Just Jeans, Jay Jays, Jacqui E, Portmans, Dotti, Peter Alexander, and Smiggle are headquartered on Church Street, Richmond
 Madman Entertainment has its head office in the Richmond suburb and in the Melba Ward in Yarra.
 Pacific Star Network Limited, an ASX-listed radio broadcaster best known for SEN 1116, is based on Swan Street, Richmond.
 REA Group which includes realestate.com.au has its head office located on Church Street, Richmond.
 Schwartz Publishing publisher of The Monthly, Quarterly Essay and the book imprint Black Inc is located on Langridge Street, Collingwood.
 SitePoint, a global technology publisher and its website subsidiaries 99designs.com, Flippa.com, Learnable.com and Wave Digital are based on Cambridge Street and Wellingston Street, Collingwood.

See also
 List of Melbourne suburbs
 Fitzroy Town Hall
 Collingwood Town Hall

References

External links
Official website
Public Transport Victoria local public transport map 
Link to Land Victoria interactive maps

Local government areas of Melbourne
Greater Melbourne (region)